The third season of American Dad! aired from September 10, 2006, to May 20, 2007.

The season consisted of nineteen episodes. The first half of the season is included in the Volume 2 DVD box set, which was released on May 15, 2007; and the second half is included in the Volume 3 DVD box set, which was released on April 15, 2008.


Episode list

Reception
"Lincoln Lover" was nominated for Outstanding Individual Episode by the Gay & Lesbian Alliance Against Defamation at the 18th GLAAD Media Awards.  The award is meant to recognize and honor various branches of the media for their outstanding representations of the lesbian, gay, bisexual and transgender (LGBT) community and issues.

"The American Dad After School Special" was nominated for the 2007 Annie Award for Best Writing in an Animated Television Production.

The season received generally positive reviews from critics.

References
General
 

Specific

External links

 
2006 American television seasons
2007 American television seasons

ru:The American Dad After School Special